J Harlen Bretz (2 September 1882 – 3 February 1981) was an American geologist, best known for his research that led to the acceptance of the Missoula Floods and for his work on caves.

Early life and education
Bretz was born on 2 September 1882, in the small town of Saranac in Ionia County, Michigan. He was the first of Oliver Joseph Bretz and Rhoda Maria Howlett's five children. His father was a farmer, and proud descendant of early German settler in Ohio, John Bretz.

The county's birth registry recorded his name as "Harlan J Bretz" at birth, but he was listed as "Harland J Bretz" on the 1900 United States Census. When he entered college in 1901, he applied as "J Harlen Bretz". At around the time he completed his graduate studies in 1913, he stopped using a point after the initial at "J". According to his two children, his given name was actually "Harley". Bretz's daughter Rhoda Bretz Riley went on to explain that "he invented the Harlen thing, just as he had invented the J in front of his name", though this contradicts official records. Most friends and associates just called him "Doc" in his later life.

Bretz earned an AB degree in biology from Albion College in 1905, then started his career as a high school History and Physiography (study of the physical features of the Earth's surface) teacher in Seattle. During this time, he became interested in the geology of Eastern Washington, and began studying the glacial geology of the Puget Sound area. He continued his studies at the University of Chicago where he earned his PhD in geology in 1913. He became an assistant professor of geology, first at the University of Washington and then the University of Grand Coulee.

The Spokane floods: an outrageous hypothesis
In the summer of 1922, and for the next seven years, Bretz conducted field research of the Columbia River Plateau. Between the Summer of 1922 through 1931 he wrote 15 papers.

Since 1910 he had been interested in unusual erosion features in the area after seeing a newly published topographic map of the Potholes Cataract. Bretz coined the term Channelled Scablands in 1923 to describe the area near the Grand Coulee, where massive erosion had cut through basalt deposits. The area was a desert, but Bretz's theories required cataclysmic water flows to form the landscape, for which Bretz coined the term Spokane Floods in a 1925 publication.

Bretz published a paper in 1923, arguing that the Channelled Scablands in Eastern Washington were caused by massive flooding in the distant past. This was seen as arguing for a catastrophic explanation of the geology, against the prevailing view of uniformitarianism, and Bretz's views were initially discredited. However, as the nature of the Ice Age was better understood, Bretz's original research was vindicated, and by the 1950s his conclusions were also vindicated.

Bretz encountered resistance to his theories from the geology establishment of the day. The geology establishment was resistant to such a sweeping theory for the origin of a broad landscape for a variety of reasons, including lack of familiarity with the remote areas of the interior Pacific Northwest where the research was based, and the lack of status and reputation of Bretz in the eyes of the largely Ivy League-based geology elites. Furthermore, his theory implied the potential possibilities of a Biblical flood, which the scientific community strongly rejected. The Geological Society of Washington invited the young Bretz to present his previously published research at a meeting on 12 January 1927, where several other geologists presented competing theories. Bretz saw this as an ambush, and referred to the group as six "challenging elders". Their intention was to defeat him in a public debate, and thereby end the challenge his theories posed to their conservative interpretation of uniformitarianism.

Another geologist at the meeting, Joseph Pardee, had worked with Bretz and had evidence of an ancient glacial lake that lent credence to Bretz's theories. Pardee, however, lacked the academic freedom of Bretz, as he worked for the United States Geological Survey, so did not enter the fray.

Bretz defended his theories, kicking off an acrimonious 40-year debate over the origin of the Scablands. As he wrote in 1928, "Ideas without precedent are generally looked upon with disfavour and men are shocked if their conceptions of an orderly world are challenged".

Both Pardee and Bretz continued their research over the next 30 years, collecting and analysing evidence that eventually identified Lake Missoula as the source of the Spokane Floods and creator of the Channelled Scablands. Research on open channel hydraulics and NASA satellite images in the 1970s further vindicated Bretz's and Pardee's theories.

National Geographic observes: "As philosopher Thomas Kuhn observed, new scientific truths often win the day not so much because opponents change their minds, but because they die off. By the time the Geological Society of America finally recognized Bretz’s work with the Penrose Medal, the field’s highest honour, it was 1979 and Bretz was 96 years old. He joked to his son, "All my enemies are dead, so I have no one to gloat over."

Caves and karst
Bretz wrote an extremely influential paper on the morphology and origin of limestone caves in 1942, followed by detailed studies of the caves of Missouri in 1956, and Illinois with Stanley Harris, in 1961.

Later life
Bretz and his wife Fanny Belle Challis (1881-1972), whom he had met at Albion College, married in 1906, and had two children, Rudolf Challis Bretz and Rhoda Bretz Riley. The Bretz family settled in Homewood, Illinois where they bought property and constructed a Sears Catalog Home on it in 1921. Bretz nicknamed the property "Boulderstrewn" because of all the rocks and minerals he collected and was given that were placed around the property. He donated a portion of this collection to Albion College in the 1970s. Boulderstrewn was renowned for being an active place, where Bretz hosted many parties with students and faculty from the University of Chicago. His post-retirement body of work includes Geology of the Chicago Region (1955), The Caves of Missouri (1956), Washington's Channeled Scabland (1959), Caves of Illinois (1961), and Geomorphic History of the Ozarks (1965), in addition to his 1949 Incomplete Genealogy of the Family of John Bretz Of Fairfield Co, Ohio, with a Partial History of One Line of Descent in this Family.

Awards and honours
The National Speleological Society made Bretz an honorary member in 1954.

Bretz received the Penrose Medal, the Geological Society of America's highest award, in 1979, at the age of 96. After this award, he told his son: "All my enemies are dead, so I have no one to gloat over."

Each year at Albion College, the J Harlen Bretz Award is given to the most outstanding senior in the geology department.

Bretz Drive in Homewood, Illinois was named in his honour.

A plaque  was dedicated to Bretz in 1994 outside the Visitor Center at Dry Falls State Park in Coulee City, Washington that reads "Dedicated to J Harlen Bretz who patiently taught us that catastrophic floods may sometimes play a role in nature's unfolding drama".

Notes

Bibliography

 Digitized for the web by Michael McMillan.

External links
Ice Age Floods Study of Alternatives and Environmental Assessment, National Park Service.
PBS's NOVA: Mystery of the Megaflood was an episode about the Scablands and Dr Bretz.
Ice Age Floods Institute is a nonprofit organization committed to public recognition and education about the Ice Age Floods.
The J Harlen Bretz Papers at University of Chicago Library.
Victor R Baker The Spokane Flood debates: historical background and philosophical perspective. .
J Harlen Bretz Memoirs written in his early 90s in four volumes.
Albion trips to Boulderstrewn, Homewood, IL details of Albion College student visits to Bretz's house Boulderstrewn in Homewood, Illinois.
New York Times Obituary Obituary for "Jerry" Harlen Bretz in the NY Times.

1882 births
1981 deaths
Albion College alumni
Catastrophism
20th-century American geologists
American people of German descent
Penrose Medal winners
University of Chicago alumni
University of Chicago faculty
University of Washington faculty